End of the World is a 1977 American science fiction film directed by John Hayes.

Plot
NASA Professor Andrew Boran is a research scientist who discovers strange radio signals in outer space that appear to originate from Earth. The signals seem to predict natural disasters that are occurring around the globe.

When he and his wife Sylvia decide to investigate the source of the signals, they end up being held captive in a convent that has been infiltrated by aliens. These invaders, from the planet Utopia, plan to destroy the world with the natural disasters. They have replicated the original inhabits of the convent and now pose as the Father and the nuns.

While posing as the human Father Pergado, the alien leader Zindar explains Earth is a hotbed of disease that cannot be permitted to continue polluting the galaxy.

Boran and Sylvia decide in the end not to stop the destruction of Earth and instead return to Utopia with Zindar. To make the return safely, Zindar holds Sylvia hostage and demands that Boran steal a Variance Crystal from the lab so that they can escape the destruction of Earth. Earth then explodes.

Cast
 Christopher Lee as Father Pergado / Zindar
 Sue Lyon as Sylvia Boran
 Kirk Scott as Professor Andrew Boran
 Dean Jagger as Ray Collins
 Lew Ayres as Commander Joseph Beckerman
 Macdonald Carey as John Davis
 Liz Ross as Sister Patrizia
 Jon van Ness as Mr. Sanchez

Reception

Creature Feature found it to be cheap and plodding, giving it 1.5 out of 5 stars. TV Guide gave the movie 1 of 5 stars. Moria found the movie dull and legendarily bad, only worth viewing to see the early work of Charles Band, and gave the movie 1/2 of a star. It further said Lee gave a very good performance, much better than the movie deserved.

Production
Produced by Charles Band. Moria states that in an in an interview from the 1970s Lee said he was lied to about the quality of the film to be produced to get him to agree to star in the movie.

Release

Released on DVD in 2005.

References

External links 
 
 

1977 films
1970s science fiction films
American science fiction films
American disaster films
1970s English-language films
Films directed by John Hayes
1970s American films